During the 2013–14 season, the Guildford Flames participated in the semi-professional English Premier Ice Hockey League. It was the 22nd year of Ice Hockey played by the Guildford Flames and the seventh season under Paul Dixon as head coach.

Player statistics

Netminders

Schedule and results

Pre-season

Regular season
The league consists of 54 games. The first home and away league games against each opponent (a total of 18 games) counts for both League and Cup table points.

References

External links
Official Guildford Flames website

Guildford Flames seasons
Guil